Erika Strasser (17 March 1934 – 30 April 2019) was an Austrian athlete. She competed in the women's javelin throw at the 1960 Summer Olympics and the 1968 Summer Olympics. She was married to journalist Leo Strasser. She was a president of the Austrian Athletics Federation from 1985 to 1994.

References

1934 births
2019 deaths
Athletes (track and field) at the 1960 Summer Olympics
Athletes (track and field) at the 1968 Summer Olympics
Austrian female javelin throwers
Olympic athletes of Austria
Sportspeople from Linz